The 910th Air Refueling Squadron is an inactive unit of the United States Air Force.  In 1985, it was consolidated with the 10th Tactical Reconnaissance Squadron and the 310th Attack Squadron, but has not been active since consolidation.

The first predecessor of the squadron was activated in 1942 as the 10th Observation Squadron.  The squadron performed antisubmarine patrols off the Pacific coast shortly after activating.  As the 10th Tactical Reconnaissance Squadron, it briefly saw combat in the European Theater of World War II before returning to the United States for inactivation.

The 910th Air Refueling Squadron was a Strategic Air Command (SAC) unit that provided air refueling for SAC bombers from Bergstrom Air Force Base, Texas from 1958 to 1966, when SAC withdrew from Bergstrom and the squadron was inactivated.

The 310th Attack Squadron was activated at England Air Force Base, where it trained for deployment to Vietnam, in 1969. Shortly after it arrived at Bien Hoa Air Base it was inactivated and its personnel and equipment transferred to another unit.

History

World War II

The 10th Observation Squadron was activated in 1942 at Morrow Field, California, and assigned to the 69th Observation Group. From June through September of that year, it performed antisubmarine patrols off the Pacific coast. The unit engaged in air-ground training with a variety of aircraft from 1943 through 1944. It also participated in maneuvers in Louisiana. In December 1943, the squadron re-equipped with Bell P-39 Airacobra and Curtiss P-40 Warhawk fighter aircraft for reconnaissance.

In January 1945, it moved to Key Field, Mississippi, where it began training with North American F-6 Mustangs and prepared for overseas deployment. The next month it left Key Field for the New York Port of Embarkation and on 7 March sailed on the SS Marine Dragon.  It landed at Le Havre, France, in the European Theater of Operations shortly before the surrender of Germany.  The squadron joined Ninth Air Force in France.  It saw combat for a short period, flying visual and photographic air reconnaissance missions to provide intelligence for air and ground units.

The squadron returned to the United States starting in July 1945.  Soon after returning to Drew Field, Florida, in August 1945, it was stripped of its manpower and existed on paper only until it was inactivated in 1946.

Cold War

The 910th Air Refueling Squadron was established under Strategic Air Command (SAC) in the fall of 1958 at Bergstrom Air Force Base, Texas, where it was assigned to the 4130th Strategic Wing.  The squadron's first Boeing KC-135 Stratotanker arrived on 17 January 1959. The 4130th wing was established by SAC in a program to disperse its Boeing B-52 Stratofortress bombers over a larger number of bases, thus making it more difficult for the Soviet Union to knock out the entire fleet with a surprise first strike. The squadron provided air refueling primarily to the B-52s of the 4130th wing.   Starting in 1960, one-third of the squadron's aircraft were maintained on fifteen-minute alert, fully fueled and ready for combat to reduce vulnerability to a Soviet missile strike.  This was increased to half the squadron's aircraft in 1962. In August 1960, a crew from the 910th placed first in SAC's combat crew competition.

In September 1963, the 340th Bombardment Wing assumed the aircraft, personnel, and equipment of the discontinued 4130th wing. The 4130th was a Major Command controlled (MAJCON) wing, which could not carry a permanent history or lineage, and SAC wanted to replace it with a permanent unit.   The squadron transferred to the 340th wing as part of this reorganization.

The 910th deployed aircrews and airplanes to support the Young Tiger task force in Southeast Asia, providing air refueling to tactical aircraft engaged in combat operations.  In the summer of 1966, the 340th wing began to wind down operations in preparation for inactivation and transfer of Bergstrom to Tactical Air Command, and the wing and squadron were inactivated in the fall.

War in Viet Nam
The 310th Attack Squadron was activated in the late spring of 1969 at England Air Force Base, Louisiana.  It was originally assigned to the 1st Special Operations Wing, but transferred to the 4410th Special Operations Training Group, when that group replaced the 1st at England. After training with the Cessna A-37 Dragonfly it moved to Bien Hoa Air Base, Viet Nam, where it was assigned to the 3d Tactical Fighter Wing. Its aircraft were transported to Southeast Asia on Douglas C-133 Cargomasters.  Shortly after arriving in theater, it was inactivated and its personnel and equipment were transferred to the 8th Attack Squadron.

In 1985 the three squadrons were consolidated into a single unit, but the consolidated unit has not been activated.

Lineage
10th Tactical Reconnaissance Squadron
 Constituted as the 10th Observation Squadron (Medium) on 5 February 1942
 Activated on 2 March 1942
 Redesignated 10th Observation Squadron on 4 July 1942
 Redesignated 10th Reconnaissance Squadron (Fighter) on 2 April 1943
 Redesignated 10th Tactical Reconnaissance Squadron on 11 August 1943
 Inactivated on 31 March 1946
 Consolidated on 19 September 1958 with the 910th Air Refueling Squadron and the 310th Attack Squadron as the 910th Air Refueling Squadron

310th Attack Squadron
 Constituted as the 310th Attack Squadron on 5 May 1969
 Activated c. 15 May 1969
 Inactivated 15 December 1969
 Consolidated on 19 September 1958 with the 910th Air Refueling Squadron and the 10th Tactical Reconnaissance Squadron as the 910th Air Refueling Squadron

910th Air Refueling Squadron
 Constituted as the 910th Air Refueling Squadron, Heavy on 28 May 1958
 Activated on 15 October 1958
 Inactivated on 2 October 1966
 Consolidated on 19 September 1958 with the 10th Tactical Reconnaissance Squadron and the 310th Attack Squadron (remained inactive)

Assignments
 69th Observation Group (later 69th Reconnaissance Group, 69th Tactical Reconnaissance Group, 69th Reconnaissance Group): 2 March 1942 – 31 March 1946
 4130th Strategic Wing: 15 October 1958
 340th Bombardment Wing: 1 September 1963 – 2 October 1966
 1st Special Operations Wing: 15 May 1969
 4410th Special Operations Training Group: 15 July 1969
 3d Tactical Fighter Wing: 15 November 1969 – 30 November 1969

Stations

 Morrow Field, California, 2 March 1942
 Ontario Army Air Field, California, 29 May 1942
 Abeline Municipal Airport (later Abeline Army Air Field), Texas, 10 November 1942
 Esler Field, Louisiana, 3 April 1943
 Abeline Army Air Field, Texas, 10 September 1943
 Esler Field, Louisiana, 13 November 1943
 Key Field, Mississippi, 25 January 1945 – 26 February 1945
 Nancy-Ochey Airport (A-96), France, 22 March 1945
 Haguenau Airfield (Y-30), France, 3 April 1945 – July 1945
 Drew Field, Florida, 4 August 1945
 Brooks Field, Texas, 4 August 1945 – 31 March 1946
 Bergstrom Air Force Base, Texas, 15 October 1958 – 2 October 1966
 England Air Force Base, Louisiana, 15 May 1969
 Bien Hoa Air Base, Viet Nam, 15 November 1969 – 30 November 1969

Aircraft

 Douglas O-46, 1942–1943
 North American O-47, 1942–1943
 Stinson L-1 Vigilant, 1942–1943
 Taylorcraft L-2 Grasshopper, 1942–1943
 Bell P-39 Airacobra, 1943–1944
 Curtiss P-40 Warhawk, 1943–1945
 Douglas A-24 Banshee, 1943–1945
 North American B-25 Mitchell, 1943–1945
 Stinson L-5 Sentinel, 1943–1945
 North American P-51 Mustang, 1943–1946
 North American F-6 Mustang, 1945–1946
 Boeing KC-135 Stratotanker, 1958–1966
 Cessna A-37 Dragonfly, 1969

Awards and campaigns

See also
 List of MAJCOM wings of the United States Air Force
 List of United States Air Force air refueling squadrons

References

Notes

Bibliography

Further reading

External links
 

Military units and formations established in 1958
Units and formations of Strategic Air Command
Air refueling squadrons of the United States Air Force
1942 establishments in the United States